This is a partial list of all Barefoot Contessa episodes.

Episodes

Season 1

Season 2

Season 3

Season 4

Season 5

Season 6

Season 7

Season 8

Season 9

Season 10

Season 11

Season 12

Season 13

Season 14

Season 15

Season 16

Season 17

Season 18

Season 19

Season 20

Season 21

Season 22

Season 23

Season 24

Season 25

Specials

References 

Lists of cooking series episodes
Lists of American non-fiction television series episodes